Chikly is a small island located in the northern part of Lake of Tunis which houses Fort Santiago Chikly, a former Roman citadel which was reconstructed by the Spanish Governor of Goletta, Luys Peres Varga, between 1546 and 1550. The fort was completely abandoned in 1830 and was left to deteriorate.

Chikly was declared a national cultural heritage asset in December 1993 and is owned by the Ministry of Culture of Tunisia. The fort is being restored as part of the Tunisian-Spanish cooperation involving the National Heritage Institute and the University of Madrid. Excavation and cleaning took place in 1994 followed by archaeological excavations in 1995. These found mosaics and charts dating back to the Roman and Byzantine periods in the 4th and 5th centuries.

References 

Islands of Tunisia
Forts in Tunisia
Tunisia geography articles needing translation from French Wikipedia
Lake islands of Africa